The Three Men, She Loves is a 2019 Burmese drama film, directed by Maung Myo Min starring Yan Aung, Pyay Ti Oo, Min Oo, Min Phone Myat, Moht Moht Myint Aung, Eaindra Kyaw Zin, Nan Sandar Hla Htun and Emily Bo.

Cast
Eaindra Kyaw Zin as Thamudaya Khin
Pyay Ti Oo as Thet Wai
Yan Aung as U Ko Ko Latt
Min Oo as Ye Htut
Min Phone Myat as Min Phone Myat
Nan Sandar Hla Htun as Wah Goon Phyu
Moht Moht Myint Aung as mother of Thamudaya Khin
Emily Bo as Emily Bo
Jo Jin Hee as Yu-mi
Pyae Pyae as Ji-ae

References

2019 films
2010s Burmese-language films
Burmese drama films
Films shot in Myanmar
2019 drama films